Městský stadion is a multi-purpose stadium in Ústí nad Labem, Czech Republic. It is mainly used for football matches and is the home ground of FK Ústí nad Labem. The stadium had a capacity of 3,000 people (555 seated) before reconstruction. When Ústí were promoted to the Czech First League in 2010, it was ruled that the stadium did not meet the league criteria required by the football association. Therefore, FK Ústí nad Labem's 2010–11 Czech First League matches were played at Na Stínadlech. The ground was upgraded to be available the next season, although the club was subsequently relegated. The reconstructed stadium was reopened in 2014 with a capacity of 4,000 seats.

International matches
Městský stadion has hosted one friendly match of the Czech Republic national football team

References
 Photo gallery and data at Erlebnis-stadion.de

External links
 Městský stadion on FK Ústí nad Labem website

Football venues in the Czech Republic
FK Ústí nad Labem
Multi-purpose stadiums in the Czech Republic
Buildings and structures in Ústí nad Labem
Sport in Ústí nad Labem
Sports venues completed in 1945
1945 establishments in Czechoslovakia
20th-century architecture in the Czech Republic